Waronker is a surname. Notable people with the surname include:

Anna Waronker (born 1972), American singer-songwriter, composer, and producer
Joey Waronker (born 1969), American drummer and music producer
Lenny Waronker (born 1941), American record producer for Warner Bros
Shimon Waronker, New York City public school principal
Simon Waronker (1915–2005), American violinist and record producer

See also 
Voronkov

Jewish surnames